The Ensign Peak Foundation (formerly the Mormon Historic Sites Foundation) is an independent organization that seeks to contribute to the memorialization of sites important to the history of the Church of Jesus Christ of Latter-day Saints.  The organization also maintains a database of historic sites of the LDS Church called the Mormon Historic Sites Registry.

History 

The foundation was originally started in 1992 as the Ensign Peak Foundation, involved in the creation of Ensign Peak Park in Salt Lake City, Utah.  After the success of this project the organization changed to its current name and undertook a broader mission.  Their next major project was the restoration of Kirtland, Ohio including the working towards the relocation of the main road so visitors would not have to compete with traffic in visiting the historic sites there.

The current title first appeared in the LDS Church News, about the ceremony held in 1998 to remember the Haun's Mill Massacre, held jointly by the MHSF and the Missouri Mormon Frontier Foundation.

Publications 
The MHSF produces a semiannual scholarly publication called Mormon Historical Studies.  It features "essays, biographies, documents, book reviews, historical site descriptions, indexes, and archival listings relevant to subjects of general interest to Latter-day Saints".  

Mormon Historical Studies was originally The Nauvoo Journal, until its name change in spring 2000. The Nauvoo Journal started with Lyman D. Platt and the Early Mormon Research Institute in 1989, intending to aid Mormon History "by bringing to light previously unknown and little used records, by correcting false research and traditions, by indexing of other difficult records, and by publishing many sources that are inaccessible to hundreds of interested family historians and genealogists".

See also
Junius F. Wells - the "Junius F. Wells Award" is given to individuals who promote the purposes of the Foundation
Larry R. King - executive director
J Malan Heslop - president for at least part of the time it was known as the Ensign Peak Foundation 
Historic Kirtland Village

Notes

References

External links
 Official website
 Mormon Historic Sites Registry maintained by the MHSF

Heritage registers in the United States
Mormon Historic Sites Foundation
History of the Church of Jesus Christ of Latter-day Saints
Latter Day Saint organizations

Organizations established in 1992
1992 establishments in Utah